Caesarius may refer to:

 Caesarius (consul) (fl. 386-403), Eastern-Roman politician
 Caesarius of Africa (died c. 3rd century), a Christian martyr
 Caesarius of Alagno (died 1263), a Roman Catholic priest, bishop and royal counsellor
 Caesarius of Arles (468/470 – 542), ecclesiastic in Gaul
 Caesarius of Heisterbach, 13th-century Christian
 Caesarius of Nazianzus ((c. 1180 – c. 1240), physician and politician 
 Owain Caesarius, possibly Owain ap Dyfnwal (fl. 934)

See also